Le cas Lagaffe, written and drawn by Franquin, is the ninth album of the original Gaston Lagaffe series. It is composed of 52 strips previously published in Spirou. It was published in 1971 by Dupuis.

Story
Two new Gaston's pets appear: the cat, the laughing gull, plus already presented the mouse Cheese and the fish Bubulle. These new pets cause most of the gags of the album.

Background
The number of pages is 54, whereas previous albums consisted of 59.

References

 Gaston Lagaffe classic series on the official website
 Publication in Spirou on bdoubliées.com.

External links
Official website 

1971 graphic novels
Comics by André Franquin